The 2014 Aegon Classic was a women's tennis tournament played on outdoor grass courts. It was the 33rd edition of the event, and the first edition of the event as a Premier tournament on the 2014 WTA Tour. It took place at the Edgbaston Priory Club in Birmingham, United Kingdom, on 9–15 June 2014. First-seeded Ana Ivanovic won the singles title.

Points and prize money

Point distribution

Prize money 
The total commitment prize money for this year's event was $710,000

Singles main draw entrants

Seeds 

 1 Rankings as of 26 May 2014

Other entrants 
The following players received wildcards into the main draw:
  Naomi Broady
  Johanna Konta
  Heather Watson

The following players received entry from the qualifying draw:
  Eleni Daniilidou
  Katy Dunne
  Victoria Duval
  Irina Falconi
  Lyudmyla Kichenok
  Nadiya Kichenok
  Tamira Paszek
  Aleksandra Wozniak

The following player received entry into the main draw as a lucky loser:
  Tímea Babos

Withdrawals 
Before the tournament
  Eugenie Bouchard → replaced by  Alison Van Uytvanck
  Sorana Cîrstea → replaced by  Kimiko Date-Krumm
  Irina Falconi (viral illness) → replaced by  Tímea Babos
  Karin Knapp → replaced by  Mona Barthel
  Sabine Lisicki (wrist injury) → replaced by  Petra Cetkovská
  Yvonne Meusburger → replaced by  Shahar Peer
  Tsvetana Pironkova → replaced by  Zarina Diyas

Retirements 
  Katy Dunne (hip injury)

Doubles main draw entrants

Seeds 

1 Rankings as of 26 May 2014

Other entrants 
The following pair received a wildcard into the doubles main draw:
  Naomi Broady /  Heather Watson

Finals

Singles 

  Ana Ivanovic defeated   Barbora Záhlavová-Strýcová, 6–3, 6–2

Doubles 

  Raquel Kops-Jones /  Abigail Spears defeated  Ashleigh Barty /  Casey Dellacqua, 7–6(7–1), 6–1

References

External links 
 Official website

2014 WTA Tour
2014
2014 in English women's sport
2014 in English tennis